Alejandra Azcárate is a Colombian model, presenter, broadcaster, comedian, actress  born on March 3, 1976, in Bogotá.

Biography
She studied political science and journalism at Emerson College in Boston, Massachusetts. Her debut as a presenter was in 2002 in the local channel in Bogotá Citytv, as host of entertainment and news reporter for City Noticias.

In November 2003, Alejandra returned to broadcasting, this time in "Descárate with Azcárate" of RCN News from the National Beauty Pageant in Cartagena.

She later changed to head Caracol News with actress Isabella Santodomingo, from the National Beauty Pageant in Cartagena.

In 2010, she began working as a comedian and touring nationally in some theaters.

In 2021, Azcárate is the epicenter of a illegal polemic, after the seizure of a plane in San Andrés (Colombia) loaded with 1000 kilograms of cocaine was known, which was registered in the name of Interandes Helicópteros SAS, a company of which Miguel Jaramillo Arango, Azcárate’s husband and partner, is the legal representative and had departed from the Guaymaral airport in Bogotá. Alejandra has fled the country to Miami, USA, hiding from justice and the Colombian press.

Since 28 December 2021, Azcárate hosts Azcárate: No Holds Barred for Netflix, a talk-show with stand-up comedy on "age, love and sex" and it was a totally failure.

Filmography

Actress
 2015 Diomedes, the chief of the board – Yurleidis
 2012 The Most Holy Ana
 2012 Wild Angel (Colombian telenovela)- Victoria Palacios Avila
 2012 Poor Rico – Patricia Rubio
 2011 Women killer (Colombia) – Eliana, the sister
 2009 Love in custody (Colombia) (TV series) – Renata Schewin
 2008 The last happy marriage – Margarita Ortiz
 2006 on the heels of Eve (TV series) – Laura

References

Colombian female models
Colombian television presenters
Living people
21st-century Colombian actresses
Colombian film actresses
Actresses from Bogotá
1978 births
Colombian women television presenters